Associazione Calcio Milan is an Italian football club based in Milan, Lombardy. The club was founded in 1899 as Milan Foot-Ball and Cricket Club, and has competed in the Italian football league system since 1900. They were the first Italian club to qualify for the European Cup in 1955. Since then, the club has competed in every UEFA-organised competition, with the exception of the Intertoto Cup and the Europa Conference League.

The competition in which the club has had the most success is the European Cup/UEFA Champions League, which they won seven times, the first in 1963; this win made them the first Italian side to win the European Cup. The other six victories came in 1969, 1989, 1990, 1994, 2003 and 2007. The club has also won the Cup Winners' Cup twice, in 1968 and 1973; the Super Cup five times, in 1989, 1990, 1994, 2003 and 2007; and the Intercontinental Cup three times, in 1969, 1989 and 1990.

After their Champions League win in 2007, Milan also competed as UEFA's representatives at the 2007 FIFA Club World Cup, eventually winning the competition and thus becoming the first Italian and European side to win the trophy. They have also won the 1951 and 1956 Latin Cup and the 1982 Mitropa Cup.

Milan received a one-year ban from UEFA competitions on two occasions: in the 1991–92 season for refusing to resume a game against Olympique Marseille during the previous year's European Cup, and in the 2019–20 season for breaching the UEFA Financial Fair Play Regulations.

History

1938-1961: European debut and first successes 
The club's debut in European competitions occured in the first round of the 1938 Mitropa Cup, when they lost 3–0 to FC Ripensia Timișoara. The following home win by 3–1 was not enough to reach the quarter finals.
The early 1950s marked the resurgence of Milan in both  Italian (where they won their first scudetto in 44 years) and European soil, mainly thanks to the so called Gre-No-Li, a trio of attacking players formed by Swedish footballers Gunnar Gren, Gunnar Nordahl and Nils Liedholm. The first appearance in a continental match in this new era took place in the 1951 semifinal match of the Latin Cup, where Milan defeated Atlético Madrid with a 4–1 score which allowed them to reach the final against Lille, won with a 5–0 score. This first European achievement was repeated five years later thanks to the victory in the 1956 Latin Cup final against Athletic Bilbao (3–1). Milan holds the record of most Latin Cup wins, with two (record shared with Real Madrid and Barcelona).

Milan first competed in the European cup in the 1955–56 season. The club's first match in European cup was a round-of-16 tie against Saarbrücken; Milan lost the home match 3–4. The return leg was played at the Ludwigspark Stadion in Saarbrücken, and the match finished as a 4–1 win for Milan, which allowed them to qualify for the next round. After eliminating Rapid Wien in the quarter-finals, Milan faced Real Madrid in the semi-finals. The first leg took Milan to the Santiago Bernabéu Stadium, where they were defeated 4–2. Despite winning 2–1 in the second leg back at San Siro, they were eliminated from the competition.

The 1957–58 European Cup campaign saw Milan defeating Rapid Wien in the preliminary round, where a play-off was needed to determine the winner, Rangers in the first round, Borussia Dortmund in the quarter-finals and Manchester United in the semi-finals, eliminating the latter thanks to a convincing 4–0 win at San Siro. Milan met Real Madrid in the final at the Heysel Stadium in Brussels. Real Madrid were the favorites and came from two wins in the previous editions of the trophy, but Milan proved to be a tough opponent and the game was memorable. Milan led 1–0 and then 2–1 but were reached by Héctor Rial scoring the 2–2. The game went to the extra time and in the end Real Madrid prevailed with a final score of 3–2.

The late 1950s and early 1960s were also to be remembered for Milan's participation in some unrecognized competitions such as the Coppa dell'Amicizia and the Inter-Cities Fairs Cup. The former was a friendly competition between Italy and France, where clubs of each country faced each other in a two-legged tie format. The Italian representatives, included Milan, won the trophy in 1959, 1960 and 1961. In the Inter-Cities Fairs Cup Milan did not achieve remarkable results.

1961-1974: Nereo Rocco's European and worldwide triumphs 
In 1960, Milan secured a young talent from Alessandria, his name is Gianni Rivera. He immediately impressed the San Siro audience with his pure technique and went on to be the pillar of Milan's successes for two decades. One year later, Nereo Rocco was hired as manager of the club, bringing to Milan his experience on the Catenaccio approach, which he integrated with a good attacking phase, thanks also to new signings such as Dino Sani, José Altafini and Amarildo. Milan's Serie A title in 1961-62 granted them access to the European Cup the following season. Milan eliminated Union Luxembourg, Ipswich Town, Galatasaray and Dundee to reach the final with Benfica in Wembley, London. Thanks to a brace of José Altafini, the top-scorer of the tournament with 14 goals, Milan won the game 2–1 and lifted their first European Cup, first Italian club to achieve this result. This success allowed Milan to play the Intercontinental Cup against Santos. The first leg was played at the San Siro in Milan, on 16 October 1963. Milan won the home game 4–2. The return leg was held the following month, on 14 November, at the Maracanã in Rio de Janeiro. As Santos won the match 4–2, the two teams were level on points and a playoff had to be contested two days later. Santos won 1–0, thus securing the trophy. The final was remembered for suspected corruption attempts by Santos officials towards the referee of the return leg, Juan Brozzi, who handled the game in evident favour of the Brazilians, not punishing their excessive aggressiveness on the pitch, thus allowing them to overcome the 2–0 lead Milan had at the end of the half time. Moreover, the same referee was chosen for the play-off game, where he whistled the contested penalty that gave Santos the victory. In the aftermath, the referee was then sacked by the Argentine Football Association.

In the 1963-64 season, Milan was eliminated from the European Cup by Real Madrid in the quarter-finals. The following European appearance was in the 1967–68 European Cup Winners' Cup. Milan reached the final undefeated, where they met Hamburg, beaten 2–0. In 1968-69 Milan took part in the European Cup. They met primary opponents of the time, such as Celtic in the quarter-finals, and Manchester United in the semi-finals. Both teams were eliminated and in the final Milan faced a young Ajax team that few years later would go on to dominate international football. The match displayed remarkable performances by Pierino Prati, who scored a hat-trick, and Gianni Rivera, who dominated the midfield and gifted Prati with three assists. Hence, Milan faced Estudiantes in the Intercontinental Cup final. The tie became infamous for the violent on-pitch conduct and dirty tactics employed by Estudiantes' players in the second leg of the fixture. Milan won the first leg in San Siro with a 3–0 score. In the return leg, Estudiantes' 2–1 win was not enough, and Milan achieved their first Intercontinental Cup win.

The 1969-70 European Cup campaign was unsuccessful, and Milan was eliminated by Feyenoord in the second round. In 1971-72, Milan participated in the UEFA Cup for the first time and went on to reach the semi-finals, where they were eliminated by Tottenham Hotspur. Thanks to the Coppa Italia win in the same season, in 1972-73 Milan played in the Cup Winners' Cup for their second time. The path of the rossoneri to the final was steady and regular, with no defeats, and in the final act they met Leeds United. A goal from Luciano Chiarugi gave Milan the lead after just 4 minutes from the beginning of the match. The rest of the game was approached difensively by the club, and thanks to a remarkable performance of goalkeeper William Vecchi, Milan was able to retain the 1–0 lead until the end, securing the trophy. Milan took part to another Cup Winners' Cup the following season, reaching again the final, but being defeated by Magdeburg.

1974-1995: Decline and resurgence to European dominance under Berlusconi's ownership 
The years that followed brought few results in European competitions. The best one was a quarter final in the 1975-76 UEFA Cup, with Milan being eliminated by Club Brugge. The European cup participation in 1979-80, thanks to the victory of the tenth scudetto in the previous season, ended prematurely, in the first round, due to a 1–0 home defeat to Porto. In the same season, Milan was involved in the Totonero scandal and was punished with the relegation to the second division. Milan had no troubles getting promoted to Serie A the following year, when they also won the Mitropa Cup, a trophy participated by the winners of European second division championships. However, in Serie A things were not progressing well, and the final third last place condemned Milan to their second relegation, followed by another promotion in the next season. 

Milan struggled financially and on the pitch till the mid 1980s, and was on the brink of bankruptcy when media tycoon Silvio Berlusconi took over the club in February 1986, promising their supporters to bring Milan back to the old glory, both domestically and internationally. The first European campaigns of Berlusconi's Milan brought meager results, being eliminated in the third round of the 1985-86 UEFA Cup by Waregem and in the second round of the 1987-88 UEFA Cup by Espanyol. However, the formation of a revolutionizing team was on its way. A mix of young players such as Roberto Donadoni and affirmed stars as Carlo Ancelotti, Marco Van Basten and Ruud Gullit were added to an already solid base formed by the likes of Paolo Maldini and Franco Baresi. The mind behind this team was Arrigo Sacchi, a young and relatively inexperienced manager but with modern and courageous ideas that contrasted the defensive approach typical of Italian sides of the period. After some months of trial, where some players struggled to assimilate the highly intensive training techniques adopted by Sacchi, the team started to impose its fast-paced and high-pressing play to its opponents. The conquest of the scudetto in the 1987-88 season granted Milan access to the European Cup the following  season, when they completed the team with the addition of Frank Rijkaard. After eliminating Levski Sofia in the first round, the next opponent was Red Star Belgrade. The return leg was surrounded by an aura of surrealism. The home team was leading 1-0 when a dense fog fell on the pitch, which lead to the referee suspending the game on the 57th minute. By the regulation of the time, a rematch would have to be played the following day. After an intense fight, which included a heavy injury for Donadoni, Milan won at the penalty shoot-out after the game ended 1–1. Milan went on defeating Werder Bremen in the quarter-finals, and met Real Madrid in the semi-finals. Contrary to the approach of Italian teams of the time, Sacchi's Milan went to Madrid with the intent of winning the game, and they nearly did so, with a dominating performance that granted them a 1–1 score. The return leg was the perfect game of Sacchi's formation, which outshined the opponents with a 5–0 victory. The final against Steaua București was won 4–0 with two braces of Gullit and Van Basten at the Camp Nou in Barcelona. Subsequently, Milan won the 1989 European Super Cup against Barcelona in a two-legged tie which saw the rossoneri drawing 1–1 in Spain and winning 1–0 at home. In the 1989 Intercontinental Cup the opponent was Atlético Nacional. The Colombians blocked successfully the Milan players and the game was resolved only at the 119th minute, in the extra time, with a free kick by Alberico Evani, which set the final score to 1–0 for the rossoneri. 

The following season, Milan replicated the same three European achievements proving to be the best team of their time. In fact, they won another European Cup beating Benfica 1–0 and eliminating Real Madrid and Bayern Munich on the way to the final; they conquered the 1990 European Super Cup with a two-legged tie win against Sampdoria; finally, they beat Club Olimpia 3–0 in the 1990 Intercontinental Cup. After almost three years at high playing and training pace, the team suffered some fatigue in the 1990-91 season, when they could not repeat the European exploits of the previous spells. In the European Cup they were eliminated in the quarter finals by Marseille in odd circumstances. After a 1–1 in the first leg in San Siro, the French were in the lead 1–0 in the return leg when, at the 87th minute, the game was suspended as Milan refused to continue playing when some floodlights went off. In the aftermath, UEFA decided to punish such behavior by giving Marseille a 3–0 win and banning Milan from European competitions for the 1991-92 season.

Milan returned to the Champions League in 1992-93, with Fabio Capello as the new manager, who, in the previous season, had replaced Sacchi. With most of Sacchi's players still part of the team, the club reached the final winning every game and conceding only one goal. Marseille was the opponent and once again Milan had to surrender to them, losing the match 1–0. However, soon after Marseille's victory, allegations of match fixing were directed at them and their president Bernard Tapie. This involved a league game that took place six days before the final, where Marseille, it emerged, had fixed their title-clinching Division 1 game against Valenciennes so they could concentrate on the final against Milan. It is believed that Tapie bribed Valenciennes to lose so that Marseille would win the French league earlier, and above all that they would not injure the Marseille players before the final against Milan. The French club were banned from defending their European title in the 1993–94 season, and contesting the Super Cup and the Intercontinental Cup. Milan was therefore granted the right to compete in the latter two competitions. However, they lost both the Super Cup, against Parma, and the Intercontinental Cup, against São Paulo.

In 1993-94, the rossoneri tried the assault to the Champions League once again, and this time they were successful. They reached the final unbeaten, conceding only two goals in the whole competitions (a European Cup/Champions League record shared with Aston Villa). In the final, Milan defeated Barcelona with a clear 4–0 score. In the 1994-95 season they won the Super Cup thanks to a 0–0 draw at Highbury and a 2–0 win at San Siro, while the Intercontinental Cup proved again unsuccessful for Milan, which lost 2–0 against Vélez Sársfield. In the Champions League, Milan reached the final for the third consecutive year (a record shared with Real Madrid and Juventus), but lost 1–0 to Ajax thanks to a late goal of Patrick Kluivert. This final marked the end of an era of international dominance of the club, which lasted almost uninterruptedly from 1988 to 1995.

Matches 
AC Milan's score listed first.

UEFA and FIFA competitions

Other international competitions

Overall record

By competition 
As of 8 March 2023.

By clubs 
As of 8 March 2023.

Key

By country
As of 8 March 2023.

Key

Honours

Footnotes

References 

A.C. Milan
Milan